Women's Club (French: Club de femmes) is a 1956 French-Italian drama film directed by Ralph Habib and starring Nicole Courcel, Dany Carrel and Ivan Desny.

Cast
 Nicole Courcel as Nicole Leroy  
 Dany Carrel as Sylvie  
 Ivan Desny as Laurent Gauthier  
 Jean-Louis Trintignant as Michel  
 Giorgia Moll as Gina  
 Vanja Orico 
 Guy Bertil as Daniel  
 Jean Martinelli as M. Mouss  
 Jean-Marc Tennberg as M. Morel 
 Noël Roquevert as Le notaire  
 Maurice Gardett as Le voisin  
 Béatrice Altariba as Dominique  
 Françoise Delbart as Chounette  
 Vega Vinci as Françoise  
 Chantal de Rieux as Françoise  
 Sophie Grimaldi as Jacqueline  
 Jacqueline Dorian as Geneviève  
 Claudine Bleuse as Mireille  
 Margaret Rung 
 Fédora as Fédora  
 Mijanou Bardot as Micheline  
 Pierre Repp as L'huissier  
 Agnès Laurent 
 Daniel Ceccaldi 
 Marie-José Nat 
 Dominique Boschero 
 Alexandra Stewart 
 Annie Andrel 
 Guy Tréjan 
 Colette Fleury

References

Bibliography 
 Bock, Hans-Michael & Bergfelder, Tim. The Concise Cinegraph: Encyclopaedia of German Cinema. Berghahn Books, 2009.

External links 
 

1956 films
1956 drama films
French drama films
Italian drama films
1950s French-language films
Films based on works by Jacques Deval
Films directed by Ralph Habib
1950s French films
1950s Italian films
Italian black-and-white films
French black-and-white films